Chomp is a brand of chocolate bar which was first manufactured by Cadbury South Africa in the early 1970s, . It is currently manufactured and popular in South Africa, Australia and the United Kingdom.

History 
There are different versions of the bar available in each location. The Australian Chomp consists of a layer of wafer and caramel, coated in compound chocolate. The Australian chomp is also longer and thinner than the UK version, and comes in a 30g size. The Australian Chomp slogan is 'It's a monster chew!', and the packaging features a green T-rex named Tyrone wearing a hat, who also featured on Australian television commercials riding a skateboard.

During the 1970s Chomp bars were sold in Australia with the catchphrase "Ten cents never tasted so good".
At one point, there were strawberry and peppermint flavours available.

Chomps manufactured in South Africa are sold in that country and throughout Southern Africa, where the packaging features a green T-rex named Tyrone wearing a hat, who also featured on Australian television commercials riding a skateboard., with the popular slogan, "Cadbury's Chomp - the greatest chocolatey mouthful". In South Africa and Namibia, it is available in a 22.7g bar, as well as a strip weighing 60.4g and a treat size of 360g.  The advertisements for Cadbury Chomp in South Africa have been greatly popular since the early 1970s, and feature a father Hippo teaching his son to exercise his jaws in order to grab a full mouthful of chocolatey goodness.

In 2009, the UK version of Chomp got a new look, the 'C' resembles a mouth with teeth.

Chomp was produced in the Keynsham plant in Somerset, UK; however, in November/December 2010, production was to be transferred to Cadbury's new plant in Skarbimierz, Poland. Labels for these products do not state a country of origin, instead stating "Made in the EU under license from Cadbury UK Ltd".

References

Australian confectionery
Cadbury brands
Chocolate bars
Mondelez International brands